The Komsomolsky Railway Bridge (Komsomolsky Zheleznodorozhny Most) is a bridge over the Ob River, connecting the Kirovsky and Pervomaysky districts of Novosibirsk, Russia. It was built in 1930–1931.

The second railway bridge across the Ob River in the system of the Trans-Siberian Railway.

History
Construction of the bridge started in December 1930.

It was opened on October 17, 1931.

External links
 Имени КИМа... Библиотека сибирского краеведения. Library of Siberian Local History.

Bridges in Novosibirsk
Bridges over the Ob River
Bridges completed in 1931
Kirovsky District, Novosibirsk
Pervomaysky District, Novosibirsk
Rail transport in Novosibirsk Oblast